The Cuban crow (Corvus nasicus) is one of four species of crow that occur on islands in the Caribbean. It is closely related to the white-necked crow (C. leucognaphalus) and Jamaican crow (C. jamaicensis), with which it shares similar features. The fourth Caribbean crow, the palm crow (C. palmarum), is a later arrival in evolutionary terms, and shows characteristics more akin to North American species, such as the fish crow (C. ossifragus), which it is probably closely related to.

Distribution and habitat
It can be found quite commonly over most of the large island of Cuba and on the nearby Isla de la Juventud (as well as the Turks and Caicos islands) in woodland and areas that have been cleared for agriculture. It is frequently found around farms and villages where it seems to have adapted quite well to living in relatively close contact with human settlements.

Description
A stocky, medium-sized ( in length) forest crow, the bill of this species is long and deep with a gentle curve towards the tip giving a large headed profile. The nasal bristles sweep forward then upward and frequently reveal the nostrils which are hidden in almost all other members of the genus Corvus. There is a patch of dark grey bare skin behind the browinsh-red eye and at the base of the lower mandible. The black plumage has a bluish-purple gloss in good light. The bill, legs and feet are black.

Diet
Food consists of  fruit and insects though it does appear to take human food readily and will scavenge for scraps where the opportunity arises. Large noisy flocks can be seen feeding in trees and it will also readily feed on the ground especially where grain and other seeds have been spilt or left unprotected on the surface of a field.

Call
The voice is quite remarkable and is rather un-crow like, with strange liquid bubbling notes and high ringing sounds produced in various combinations. It also produces a thin screeched "aaaaauh" that rises in inflection.

Breeding
The nest is built in tall trees, though little further information about breeding is recorded as yet.

Image links
 Good quality series of images
 Cuban Crow videos, photos & sounds on the eBird

Footnotes

Cuban crow
Birds of Cuba
Birds of the Turks and Caicos Islands
Endemic birds of the Caribbean
Cuban crow